Mount Mazama (Giiwas in the Native American language Klamath) is a complex volcano in the state of Oregon, United States, in a segment of the Cascade Volcanic Arc and Cascade Range. Most of the mountain collapsed following a major eruption approximately 7,700 years ago. Its collapse, due to eruption of magma emptying the underlying magma chamber, formed a caldera that holds Crater Lake. The mountain is in Crater Lake National Park.

Mount Mazama formed as a group of overlapping volcanic edifices such as shield volcanoes and small composite cones, becoming active intermittently until its climactic eruption 7,700 years ago. Much of the edifice fell into the volcano's partially emptied neck and magma chamber, creating a caldera. The region's volcanic activity results from the subduction of the offshore oceanic plate, and is influenced by local extensional faulting. Mazama is dormant, but the US Geological Survey says eruptions on a smaller scale are likely, which would pose a threat to its surroundings.

Native Americans have inhabited the area around Mazama and Crater Lake for at least 10,000 years and the volcano plays an important role in local folklore. European-American settlers first reached the region in the mid-19th century. Since the late 19th century, the area has been extensively studied by scientists for its geological phenomena and more recently for its potential sources of geothermal energy. Crater Lake and Mazama's remnants sustain diverse ecosystems, which are closely monitored by the National Park Service because of their remoteness and ecological importance. Recreational activities including hiking, biking, snowshoeing, fishing, and cross-country skiing are available, and during the summer, campgrounds and lodges at Crater Lake are open to visitors.

Geography 
It lies in the southern portion of the Cascade Range.

Crater Lake National Park 

A wilderness area, it was dedicated in 1902 and is overseen by the National Park Service. It receives about 500,000 visitors each year, and these tourists can go hiking, take bike, ranger-guided, and trolley tours, swim, fish, camp, and participate in other recreational activities. While the Park area remains open throughout the year, certain roads and facilities close in the winter season.

Physical geography 

There was frequent glacier formation on the mountain as Mazama developed. They carved trenches in the flanks of the volcano in addition to U-shaped valleys under the base of the volcanic cone. These can be seen at three large glacial canyons on its southern slopes: Kerr Notch, Munson Valley, and Sun Notch. Whenever eruptions took place in the presence of ice, lava was chilled by glaciers, creating glassy talus deposits. Sometimes, the lava coursed into areas previously carved by glaciers like at Sentinel Rock, filling canyons with volcanic rock. When the climactic eruption occurred, the climate was warm and dry, and the most recent period of glacial advance ceased about 27,000 years ago, so by the time Mazama collapsed, ice was likely only present at higher elevations. Using argon geochronology and paleoclimatic records, scientists have identified that the Sand Creek, Sun Creek, and Annie Creek canyons were carved by the advance of ice over lava flows, pushing debris towards Klamath Marsh and Klamath Graben or nearby rivers. A glacial cirque can be seen on Mount Scott's northwestern flank, and glacial till occurs on Mazama's slopes, especially on the western slopes and at lower elevations. Till and fluvial sediments occur in the caldera walls, forming particularly thick deposits under Roundtop and Wineglass. Many lava flows that were glaciated have since been covered by more recent lava flows.

Lake levels rose while the Wizard Island landform inside the crater was forming. Water interacted with lava flows to form pillow lava. The water from precipitation nearly equals water lost to evaporation and drainage, most leakage taking place at the Wineglass deposit at the northern side of the crater, without which the lake would likely have overflowed at the northern side.

Average snowfall in the Crater Lake area has been decreasing since the 1930s. Crater Lake's mean surface water temperatures have increased about  since the 1960s. Though this may eventually cause algae to grow and obscure the water, Crater Lake remains one of the cleanest bodies of water in the world.

Geology 

Produced by the subduction of the Juan de Fuca tectonic plate, which moves slowly in a northeastward direction with the Gorda tectonic plate under the North American tectonic plate, Mazama is part of the Cascade Volcanic Arc that stretches from northern California to southern British Columbia. Mazama sits within a region of crustal extension marked by fault zones, including north–south-trending normal faults such as the Annie Spring fault within the West Klamath Lake fault zone, which might produce damaging earthquakes. Likewise, the Red Cone Spring fault cuts through basaltic andesite deposits at Red Cone from 35,000 years ago; together, the two faults move at an average rate of  each year. There do not appear to be faults present in the Crater Lake caldera wall, but the volcano induced a stress field in the upper crust nearby.

Mazama is underlain by the Quaternary High Cascade basalt and mafic (rich in magnesium and iron) andesite to the west and southwest, with high-volume rhyodacite lava flows from 600,000 to 700,000 years old underlying Mazama deposits to the south, southeast, east, and northeast. It is a major Cascade volcano, and is at the intersection of the Cascade Range and Klamath graben, the north–northwest trending basin also surrounded by fault zones. The Basin and Range Province lies to the east. Mazama lies within the broad segment of the Cascades arc, where smaller volcanoes are common because of melting patterns of the Earth's mantle within the region. Erupting magma that ranged from high-alumina olivine tholeiite to magnesian basaltic andesite, these volcanoes show increased contents of subduction-produced or melted fluids that mixed with another magma chamber in the mantle. These magmas vary from 47.6 percent to 73.2 percent silicon dioxide.

Mazama is the newest of the Quaternary calderas in the Cascade Volcanic Arc, which also include the Newberry calderas and the caldera at the Medicine Lake Volcano. Quaternary monogenetic volcanism throughout Oregon's High Cascades includes cinder cones, lava fields, and small shield volcanoes, which have produced lava ranging from low-potassium, high-alumina olivine tholeiite to medium-potassium calc-alkaline basalt, basaltic andesite to shoshonitic basaltic andesite.

The Mazama volcanic complex originally formed as a cluster of overlapping edifices. Made up of shield volcanoes and small stratocones, it had an irregular shape. Scott was the first of the composite volcanoes that created the Mazama complex, formed by a quick and active cone-building phase and becoming inactive long before the most recent eruption at Mazama. With time, eruptive activity moved to the west, creating the Applegate Peak and Garfield Peak cones on the southern flanks of the volcanic center. These flows, present on the southern, western, and eastern walls of Mazama's caldera, also contained lava bombs. Viscous eruptions of andesitic lava that reached thicknesses of several hundred feet further built up Mazama's cones, creating a solid, dense interior rich with angular lava blocks.

Research by Howel Williams superimposed the Crater Lake caldera on other Cascade stratovolcanoes including Mount Shasta in California and Mount Rainier in Washington state, and concluded that Mazama stood at  pre-collapse, which has been accepted as the standard estimate by geologists. By the Holocene, the Mazama volcano was made up of several, clustered peaks with Mount Scott on the eastern end and Hillman Peak on the far west side. The volcanoes likely rose in elevation from east to west, and they also featured volcanic cones and lava domes on their southern flanks. Glacial horns like the Watchman lava flow were also present, and the mountain may or may not have sustained glaciers close to the summit. It was the largest volcanic edifice between Mount Shasta in California and the Three Sisters complex in Oregon. Before the eruption, it had been significantly altered by glacial erosion, which carved U-shaped valleys on its southern and southeastern slopes. The northern and western sides of the caldera do not show prominent evidence of glacial erosion, since they feature lava flows that only underwent alteration by late Pleistocene epoch glacial motion. Outside of the caldera, most hills show evidence of glacial alteration except those from the Holocene epoch and low elevation landforms including Pleistocene lava domes and cinder cones. Mount Scott has also been heavily eroded by ice, and the Union Peak volcano now consists only of a pyramidal horn.

It now includes several small lava domes and cinder cones, including Wizard Island and the underwater volcano Merriam Cone. Except for the tallest slopes of the complex, all cones have been covered with deposits from the climactic eruption at Mazama 7,700 years ago. Scientists now use the exposed contents of the caldera rim wall to investigate eruptions and mapping the eruptive history of the region. Throughout its known eruptions, Mazama has produced 43 percent rhyodacite, 42 percent andesite, 15 percent dacite, and less than 1 percent basaltic andesite. All of the rhyodacite has been produced within the past 30,000 years of activity, suggesting that regional and local distribution of compositions were not uniform over time. Andesite and dacite lava flows from the volcano usually have plagioclase as their major phenocryst, though augite and hypersthene are also present, the latter more abundant. Olivine form minor phenocrysts, which are found throughout lava flows from Mazama, and hornblende can be found in some andesite lava flows. Basalt and mafic andesite lava flows from Mazama and nearby eruptive vents have relatively higher amounts of olivine and lack hypersthene, and the mafic andesite deposits display textures that indicate they underwent greater mixing than andesite and dacite deposits.

Mazama Ash 

In the western United States and Canada, volcanic ash often forms distinct layers among recent geological deposits, which can be used for stratigraphy among geologists and archaeologists. Given the large distribution of the historic eruption of Mount Mazama, Mazama Ash serves as a common geological marker. Mazama Ash is found at a higher layer than the Glacier Peak ash, estimated to have deposited over 13,000 years ago. Mazama Ash is the most widely distributed tephra layer from the late Quaternary in the United States and southwestern Canada, extending to eight states to the west and three Canadian provinces. Mazama Ash forms orange colored deposits.

Like the Glacier Peak Ash deposits, Mazama Ash is well preserved in the Pacific Northwest. It is distinguishable from the lump pumice deposits ejected from the Glacier Peak volcano, which contain more phenocrysts. Mazama Ash also has more soda, yttrium, ytterbium, and zirconium, and less silica and lime than eruptive products from Glacier Peak, and it forms finer deposits than Glacier Peak Ash.

With an age between 6,000 and 7,000 years, Mazama Ash corresponds to the estimated time for Mazama's climactic eruption 6,600 years ago, identified by radiocarbon dating of wood charred by ashflows. Some of the Glacier Peak ash has been found in strata beneath Mazama Ash in Washington state and in eastern Idaho,  to the southeast of Glacier Peak. Studies of Glacier Peak Ash deposits suggest that they are older than Mazama Ash, at about 12,000 years old. Glacier Peak Ash has not been found in deposits less than 10,000 years old, and nearly all human artifacts have been found above its deposits, except for a site at Birch Creek where non-diagnostic artifacts were discovered beneath Glacier Peak Ash.

Subfeatures 

Formed of a complex of stratovolcanoes and shield volcanoes, there are about 35 known satellite vents in the Mazama complex. Mazama is surrounded by monogenetic cinder cones, lava fields, and shield volcanoes made up of calc-alkaline basalt and andesite, tholeiite, and shoshonitic andesite. Varying in age from 600,000 to 40,000 years old, these edifices closely resemble other monogenetic volcanoes in the High Cascades. This large field is underlain by rhyodacite in its southeastern segment, and is cut by north–south trending normal faults.

Moving from west to northwest, Mazama stratovolcanoes and shield volcanoes grow progressively younger. The oldest, at 400,000 years old, occur at Phantom Ship and Mount Scott, while the youngest can be found at the Hillman Peak stratovolcano, dated to 70,000 years old. There are also andesite flows at the northern rim of Mazama dated to between 50,000 and 40,000 years old. Many of these deposits (both dacitic and andesitic) contain undercooled, crystal-poor segments of andesite, including at Mount Scott and Phantom Cone. Lava and ice interactions are suggested by exposures of glassy breccia in Mazama's caldera, as well as lava flows covering glaciated lava deposits.

About 70,000 years ago, several silicic (rich in silicon dioxide), explosive eruptions occurred, including a significant event at Pumice Castle on the eastern wall of Mazama. This formed welded deposits near the vent, also forming non-welded deposits to the south and on the northern part of Mazama. Between 40,000 years ago and Mazama's major eruption, no andesitic or dacitic volcanism took place. However, rhyodacitic magma was erupted at Grouse Hill, Steel Bay, and Redcloud Cliff in the form of pumice and lava flows made of hornblende-phyric, or chemically evolved, rhyodacite. During this period of the late Pleistocene or early Holocene, lava domes such as those at Sharp Peak, Grouse Hill, and Merriam Point formed, sharing chemical compositions, with silica contents at about 70%.

Pyroclastic cones at Mazama include Wizard Island, Bald Crater, Maklaks Crater (also known as Diller Cone) and Forgotten Cone. Nearby cinder cones include Bear Butte, Crater Peak, Desert Cone, Lookout Butte, Pothole Butte, Red Cone, Scout Hill, and Union Peak. There are at least 13 cinder cones within Crater Lake National Park, and at least eleven more in the nearby area. They were fed by a different magma chamber than Mazama, though they likely received magma from basaltic andesite reservoirs in the vicinity. The exception is Williams crater, which erupted basalt and dacite and got silicic lava from the western part of Mazama's magma chamber. Stratovolcanoes in Mazama's vicinity consist of Sentinel Rock, Mount Scott, Phantom Cone, Dutton Cliff, and Danger Bay.

Mazama has a few composite cones in the vicinity of the caldera. At about 420,000 years old, Mount Scott has a conical shape, but has been extensively altered by Pleistocene glacial erosion, which carved a large cirque on its western flank and smaller ones on its eastern and northeastern sides. Scott lacks a summit crater. Hillman Peak was the youngest composite cone in the Mazama eruptive center, forming about 70,000 years ago. The cone was cut down the middle during Mazama's collapse post-eruption, creating a cross-section of its interior composition.

Shield volcanoes that contributed to Mazama's growth only erupted for several hundred to several thousand years. They erupted rapidly, spraying fluid lava that included lava bombs and incandescent fragments. Llao shield on the northwestern side of the Mazama complex shows a representative structure for the shields that helped form Mazama.

Eruptive history

Early activity 

The Mazama vicinity formed gradually, its earliest deposits consisting of dacite from up to 1.28 million years ago. This featured up to 40 rhyodacitic domes and lava flows, produced between 470,000 and 410,000 years ago before stratocone formation began.

Mazama formed as a group of overlapping volcanic edifices, which included shield volcanoes and small composite cones.
Cone-building eruptions took place within short periods of time. Shield volcanoes fed Mazama's expansion with basaltic andesite lava flows that covered large expanses on the slopes of the mountain. Forming lava fountains similar to those observed in Hawaiian eruptions, the shield volcanoes erupted incandescent lava bombs and were deposited on the southern, western, and eastern flanks of the complex. Roughly 215,000 years ago, another flank vent erupted dacitic lava that coursed to the west for at least , with volcanic dikes that trend toward the vent still present in the Mazama caldera wall. The complex remained inactive for about 40,000 years before it resumed activity, erupting andesitic lava from another flank vent, building a large shield volcano from 170,000 to 120,000 years ago. Other andesitic lava deposits can be observed in the caldera wall's northern side. The Mazama complex was inactive between 100,000 and 75,000 years ago.

Many of the major cone-creating eruptions at Mazama were effusive rather than violently explosive, but explosive eruptions about 70,000 years ago yielded silicic lava that created thick pyroclastic deposits. These deposits include Pumice Castle, an orange edifice at the eastern wall of the caldera, which formed by the fusion of glassy pumice fragments. Similar activity on the northern side of Cloudcap and the eastern segment of Llao Rock that ejected dacitic tephra and pyroclastic rock also formed fused edifices. About 50,000 years ago, a vent at Mazama erupted the Watchman flow, which filled a canyon at the southwestern wall of the complex. From 50,000 to 40,000 years ago, Mazama vents continued to erupt andesite lava flows onto the northern and southwestern slopes and create dacite lava domes on the southern flanks. These domes often collapsed and produced pyroclastic flows that coursed down the southern slope of the volcano, forming deposits up to Devil's Backbone, a craggy volcanic dike that was exhumed when the volcano collapsed.

Throughout its eruptive history, Mazama has produced basaltic andesite, andesite, and dacite lava. About 40,000 years ago, it underwent a dramatic shift to solely rhyodacite lava, which was highly viscous and had a silica content at about 70 percent. Between 30,000 and 25,000 years ago, rhyodacitic eruptions occurred at the complex, yielding pumiceous tephra and lava flows from Grouse Hill, Steel Bay, and Redcloud Cliff. At Redcloud Cliff, a lava flow formed with glassy columns that touched glaciers, creating a large, inverted stone triangle on the eastern rim of Mazama. These same eruptions formed a nearly vertical-walled crater, producing pumice and creating a dome over the Redcloud vent. Grouse Hill's lava flow deposit and lava dome formed at about the same time, about 27,000 years ago. At the end of this eruptive sequence, rhyodacite lava domes formed on the northeastern slopes of the volcano.

It has a round center and extensions on the sides, resembling a bird of prey. The formation of Llao Rock was preceded by explosive eruptions of rhyodacite, creating pumice and ash that were ejected high into the atmosphere and carried for several hundred miles into northern and eastern Washington state, eastern Oregon, and western Nevada. A large crater formed but was filled by subsequent lava flows. Shortly before the major, caldera-forming eruption at Mazama, the Cleetwood flow was produced. Also composed of rhyodacite lava, it originated from a vent on the northern side of the complex eastward of Llao Rock. It likely only occurred weeks or months before the major eruption, as Mazama's collapse formed a backward flow of lava when it cut through the Cleetwood lava, suggesting that the Cleetwood lava was still hot enough to flow and move. Tephra from the last major eruption that was emplaced atop Cleetwood deposits has been altered by heat and gas from the Cleetwood lava. Both these eruptive periods took place on the northern flank of the Mazama complex, not far from the magma chamber that produced the climactic eruption shortly after.

Climactic eruption 

Mazama's climactic eruption has been dated to about 6,845 ± 50 years ago via radiocarbon dating, or about 7,700 years ago via dendrochronology. Other scientists have determined ages of 6,730 ± 40 years ago or roughly 7,470–7,620 calendar years ago, as well as 7,627 ± 150 calendar years ago. Fallout from the eruption continued for roughly three years, though the major eruption only occurred for a few days. The eruption is thought to have occurred during autumn, as inferred from pollen data.

The eruptive activity that led to Mazama's collapse proceeded in two phases. Ash extended to eight states in the west and three Canadian provinces. As a result, Mazama Ash has become a commonly used benchmark for measuring the relative age of objects, compared to its orange colored deposits. The ejecta featured blocks of medium-grain granodiorite, as well as inclusions of diabase, quartz diorite, granite, aplite, and granophyre. Ashfall layers have been eroded by pyroclastic flows and with time, but they are still visible at Hillman Peak and along the Cleetwood Trail. The Plinian column from the eruption devastated the area hundreds of miles north and northeast of Mazama, but to the southwest and west, little pumice or ash were deposited.

The eruption's character changed dramatically as the column of pumice and ash collapsed. The exact cause is not well understood; it may have been the result of the enormous weight of the tephra or the expansion of the eruptive vent. The sudden deposition of so much pumice generated pyroclastic flows that moved down the northern side of the volcano, coursing west–east from Llao Rock to Redcloud Cliff. The first of these pyroclastic flows were deposited at superheated temperatures, welding fragments and creating the Wineglass welded tuff, which consists of big blocks of orange-brown and gray rock. These emplacements can only be observed on the northern slopes; they are absent from the southern slopes of the volcano.

Mazama was covered with incandescent pumice. The extreme weight of eruptive material began to push down on the volcano's summit, similar to a piston. Eventually, the top of Mazama's magma chamber subsided, and concentric openings formed by the summit, producing smaller vents surrounding the main eruptive cone. Pumice ejected from these new fractures created rapid pyroclastic flows that coursed down all the sides of Mazama, traveling over tall ridges and summits of subfeatures and extending tens of miles from their vents. These flows altered the surfaces surrounding Mazama, removing ashfall and then depositing their contents in nearby valleys. Ash clouds also rose up from the pyroclastic flows. Flows containing pumice coursed into the Annie Creek and Sun Creek canyons southward of Mazama, depositing  of material, which have still not been fully eroded after almost 8,000 years.

Mazama's eruptive activity drew from deeper layers of the magma chamber that fed its climactic eruption, with denser layers of andesite and basaltic andesite lying beneath lighter layers of rhyodacite. The last of the pyroclastic flows erupted contained andesitic, gray scoria that was deposited above the pale orange and yellow rhyodacite pumice from earlier phases of the eruption. The final eruptions formed the Pumice Desert, a treeless plain on the northern and northeastern side of Mazama, as well as filling the Pumice Creek valley and parts of the Klamath Marsh. Erosion from rain and stream flow has left pipes from the andesitic lava flows as columns and spires.

After the climactic eruption, Mazama's peak was completely destroyed, replaced by a depression with a depth of  surrounded by cliffs. The volume of magma erupted from Mazama during this eruption was 14 cubic miles (61 km3). The lava produced was zoned vertically according to arrangement within the source magma chamber, and was calc-alkaline in composition. It consisted of roughly 90 percent uniform rhyodacitic pumice, which contained about 10 percent phenocrysts, the rest made up of crystalline andesite scoria and mafic crystals. The total eruptive volume adds up to 42 cubic miles (176 km3) of pumice, ignimbrite, and tephra. The temperature changes were possibly greater than the effects of the 1815 eruption of Mount Tambora. Aerosol from the eruption traveled as far as Greenland, falling for as long as six years.

The United States Geological Survey has referred to the 7,700 years ago Mazama eruption as the largest explosive eruption within the Cascades in the past million years, however recent studies say that the volume of the Rockland ash, which erupted from the Lassen Volcanic Center about 600,000 years ago could be up to 326.7 km3, which would make it over twice the size of the Mazama ash. Mazama's climactic eruption was one of the largest eruptions during the Holocene epoch. The eruption had a Volcanic Explosivity Index of 7, as determined from eruption cloud height, eruptive volume, and qualitative observations.

Recent activity and potential hazards 

Since the climactic eruption 7,700 years ago, all eruptive activity at Mazama has occurred within the caldera. After the caldera formed, the original crater was widened by avalanches from the walls. These gave a scalloped profile to the caldera, such as the coves at Llao Bay, Steel Bay, and Grotto Cove. The Chaski slide, for example, the most prominent landslide detectable on the caldera wall, occurred long after the formation of the crater. As the crater filled with landslides, lava, and water, the caldera's appearance changed over time. New cones and lava fields have formed inside the caldera, all of which have been submerged except for Wizard Island. Mapping the caldera floor with high-resolution multibeam echo sounders, vehicle-motion sounders and navigators, and a dual-differential global positioning system (DGPS), scientists from the US government and universities detected volcanoes and landslide deposits under the water. Between 7,700 and 7,200 years ago, the central lava platform, the Merriam Cone, and Wizard Island were produced, as well as lava flows. These eruptions produced  of andesitic lava, half of that in the Wizard Island cone. Wizard Island lava interacted with water to form breccia piles, and as the water levels rose, only the top of the Wizard Island edifice stayed above the water. At the summit of the above-water cone, a small lava flow from a lava fountain appears, on the southwestern flank. There is also a volcanic plug poking out of the crater floor as a body of dark lava. Lava blocks with diameters of  can be seen along the rim of the crater, possibly produced from later stages of cone-building eruptions that created Wizard Island. The central platform was created by a similar vent eastward of Wizard Island, made up of effusive lava that created lava fields northward and eastward of its vent. Merriam Cone was produced underwater, and was probably formed at the same or similar time as Wizard Island and the central platform.

Mazama was last active about 4,800 years ago, when an eruption took place near Wizard Island's eastern base. This eruption took place underwater, and it produced viscous lava that created a rhyodacite lava dome, about 2,400 years after the first period of postcaldera activity. Given that Mazama has had periods of sporadic eruptions for 420,000 years, the United States Geological Survey thinks that it is "virtually certain" that Mazama will erupt again in the future. Mazama is considered dormant, but it remains monitored by the United States Geological Survey Cascades Volcano Observatory. Future eruptions would likely take place near the western side of the complex and within the caldera rim; they could occur underwater. The ejection of lava rich in gas from shallow water could produce huge ash columns, but submarine eruptions at deeper depths may decrease the explosiveness of the event. Nonetheless, the rapid mixing of water and lava could produce dangerous pyroclastic surges, which are more gaseous and less solid than pyroclastic flows. Mazama is unlikely to produce mudflows far from the caldera, though a nearby vent outside the caldera could erupt and mix with snow. Eruptions are unlikely to produce waves that extend beyond Crater Lake, but powerful explosions could produce tall waves in the caldera. An eruption as explosive as the one 7,700 years ago is unlikely given that it would require larger volumes of magma than are known to be available within the Mazama vicinity. Earthquakes from the nearby West Klamath Lake fault zone could reach magnitudes up to 7.0 on the Richter scale, but these only occur every 3,000 to 10,000 years; they could generate tall waves by creating landslides. Though local earthquakes from volcanic activity would create motion in the lake, they would likely only reach maximum magnitudes of 5.0 on the Richter scale. Crater Lake is poorly monitored, and not highly active seismically among the Cascade volcanoes. The largest earthquake threat originates from the Cascadia subduction zone, which could produce earthquakes with a magnitude of 8 or 9 that could lead to huge waves in Crater Lake.

Though the population within  of Mount Mazama is only about 50 people, more than 270,000 live within  of the volcano. Even so, highly consequential eruptions at Mazama seem unlikely in the near future. Large, pyroclastic eruptions like the climactic eruption are unlikely for thousands of years. Similarly, the release of lethal gases like carbon dioxide from Crater Lake, similar to the eruption from Lake Nyos in Cameroon in 1986, is unlikely as a result of the natural mixing of deep and surface water within the lake. There is no known mechanism by which Crater Lake's water could be catastrophically drained or by which the caldera walls would fail suddenly. Landslides could threaten visitors to the national park or researchers by creating tsunami-sized waves, also potentially damaging infrastructure surrounding the lake.

Geothermal energy 
Studies of heat flow and the water chemistry in Crater Lake and the alteration of rocks older than 120,000 years ago suggest that hydrothermal areas exist in the Mazama vicinity. Most springs show similar chemistry, from the weathering of volcanic glass and clinopyroxene. These features probably formed due to processes related to residual heat from the magma chamber that produced the climactic Mazama eruption 7,700 years ago. The convective heat discharge in Crater Lake marks the third largest in the Cascades, after the Austin Hot Springs and at Lassen Volcanic National Park. Scientists from the United States Geological Survey think that sources for geothermal energy use exist at Mazama and Crater Lake.

Ecology 

In the Cascades, the topography and elevation have influenced local climate patterns, also shaping global climate when volcanic gas and dust have been released into the atmosphere. Subalpine zones occur above , often featuring whitebark pine.

Ecological disturbances tend to cause decreasing damage with increasing distance from the source, but volcanic eruptions can lead to more uniform patterns of disruption for their surrounding landscapes. The immediate surroundings of Mazama continue to recover from the eruption.

There are more than 50 mammal species in Crater Lake National Park. Opossum species such as the Virginia opossum can be found infrequently, while shrew and mole species in the park area include marsh shrews, Pacific shrews, American water shrews, fog shrews, Trowbridge's shrews, vagrant shrews, American shrew moles, and broad-footed moles. Bats frequently sighted within the park area include the little brown bat, hoary bat, and big brown bat, while the California myotis, silver-haired bat, Yuma myotis, long-eared myotis, long-legged myotis, and pallid bat are more rare. There are populations of American pikas, snowshoe hares, and white-tailed jackrabbits in the region, as well as many rodent species. Chipmunks like yellow-pine chipmunks, least chipmunks, Siskiyou chipmunks, and Townsend's chipmunks can be seen, along with various beaver species including mountain beavers and North American beavers. The mammals of the National Park area also include various species of squirrel, mice, vole, and gophers, as well as yellow-bellied marmots and North American porcupines. Carnivorous mammals consist of coyotes, red foxes, gray foxes, American black bears, raccoons, martens, fishers, ermines, long-tailed weasels, minks, wolverines, American badgers, western spotted skunks, striped skunks, North American river otters, cougars, and lynxes such as bobcats. Elk, mule deer, and pronghorns can also be found, though more frequently during the summer season.

Bird species in the Crater Lake National Park area include various biological families. Common bird species include hairy woodpeckers, great horned owls, blue grouse, common ravens, dark-eyed juncos, mountain chickadees, red-breasted nuthatches, brown creepers, Clark's nutcrackers, and Canada jays, which are visible throughout the year; American kestrels, northern flickers, golden-crowned kinglets, Cordilleran flycatchers, Steller's jays, western tanagers, Swainson's thrushes, hermit thrushes, American robins, and rufous hummingbirds that frequent the area in the summer season; and mountain and western bluebirds in the fall and summer. Olive-sided flycatchers and chipping sparrows are common during the spring and summer seasons, while yellow-rumped warblers, pine siskins, and Cassin's finches can frequently be seen during spring, summer, and fall.

In the early 20th century, Bull trout were present in many streams and river throughout the National Park area, particularly the Sun Creek and lower Annie Creek areas. Locals began stocking streams with non-native trout populations, forcing Brook trout to compete for resources and leading to their local extinction in Annie Creek, along with a significant decline in Sun Creek by the end of the 1980s. By 1992, Crater Lake National Park initiated a bull trout conservation project, removing invasive fish populations with electrofishing, snorkeling, and introduction of the toxin and inhibitor of cellular respiration antimycin A. They also created small barriers to keep new trout from reaching Sun Creek. In 1999, Bull trout were considered a "threatened" species by the Endangered Species Act, though locally, there are now about 2,000 Bull trout in the stream, almost ten times as many as the low point for Bull trout abundance at just 200 fish. The project now works with the state government to expand Bull trout distributions from Sun Creek into neighboring forests with fish barriers and removal of invasive fish species.

Climate change threatens the American pika populations in the Crater Lake area, as they cannot tolerate warm weather because their fur does not release heat efficiently. Climate change might be diminishing their food supply via disturbances of vegetation growth patterns. At least three pika populations in Oregon have disappeared within the past few decades. Likewise, as a result of climate change, mountain pine beetle infestations have become more frequent among Whitebark pines on the rim of Crater Lake and present on nearby peaks. The National Park Service estimates that roughly half of the whitebark pines in Crater Lake National Park have died or are dying. Because the ecosystem in Crater Lake is isolated from the regional area, it holds particular interest from ecologists, so the United States National Park Service closely monitors human and natural changes to the lake environment.

Human history 

The Klamath Native Americans of the area believed that Mount Mazama was inhabited by Llao, their "Chief of the Below World." After the mountain destroyed itself the Klamaths recounted the events as a great battle between Llao and his rival Skell, their sky god, or "Chief of the Above World." The narrative has several slightly different iterations. A common variant of the legend recounts that Llao saw a beautiful Klamath woman, the daughter of a chief, and became angry when she refused his offer of immortality if she would be his consort. Furious, Llao emerged from Mazama and threw fire upon the people beneath the mountain, and Skell stood on Mount Shasta, trying to defend the people against Llao's fury. As the earth shook and volcanic rock fell from the sky, two holy men sacrificed themselves to Mount Mazama's crater, and Skell was able to force Llao back into the volcano, which then collapsed on top of him; other accounts tell that Skell smashed the peak on top of Llao. Torrential rain followed, filling in the hole left by Mazama's collapse to form Crater Lake.

Native American people have lived in the area near Mazama for at least 10,000 years. At least part of the surrounding vicinity was occupied by indigenous populations when Mazama resumed activity about 8,000 years ago, following about 20,000 years of dormancy. Most evidence suggests that Mazama served as a camp site, but not a permanent place of habitation. Sagebrush sandals have been discovered to the east of the mountain. These populations faced an increasingly dry climate and the hazards associated with volcanic activity. In civilizations south of Mazama, stories about the volcano's eruption have been transmitted for many generations. Native populations did not tell settlers about the area because it held sacred importance among tribes throughout Oregon and northern California. Shamans did not allow local Native Americans to look towards Crater Lake, and the Klamath people believed that just looking at Mazama would cause death. Some Native Americans still refuse to look at the water.

During the 19th century, one Klamath leader named Lalek predicted scientific discoveries that described Mount Mazama's destruction, claiming that it had collapsed as a result of a particularly violent eruption. Geologists had not discovered this mechanism for caldera formation yet, but the hypothesis was recorded by the soldier William M. Colvig in 1865, and then reprinted in Ella Clark's Indian Legends of the Pacific Northwest.

The last major volcanic landform in the Cascade Range identified by white settlers, Mazama was first visited by non-indigenous people in the spring of 1853. Eleven miners from Yreka, California, stopped at a mercantile store in Jacksonville, Oregon, owned by Isaac Skeeters, boasting that they knew where to find a gold mine called "Lost Cabin." Financed by a successful gold miner named John Wesley Hillman, Skeeters led a team with ten other Oregonians to find the mine. On June 12, they reached Crater Lake, which Skeeters noted had the bluest water he had ever seen, suggesting they name it "Deep Blue Lake." The trip failed to procure gold before running low on provisions. With the absence of gold in that region, their discovery was quickly forgotten.

By 1862, a separate group of Oregon prospectors led by Chauncey Nye reached the Crater Lake area. Nye authored an article for the Jacksonville Oregon Sentinel in which he wrote that he had named the depression Blue Lake for its color, the first published description of the lake. Fort Klamath was established in 1863,  to the southeast of the current boundaries of the National Park area. A wagon road was built to the Fort from the Rogue River Valley as a result. On August 1, 1865, the lake was encountered by hunters on the road, and a party of soldiers and civilians went to see the lake after hearing of their observations. Sergeant Orsen Stearns climbed down into the caldera, followed shortly after by Captain F. B. Sprague, who thought they should name the lake "Lake Majesty". Newspaper editor Jim Sutton and a group of people visited Crater Lake in August 1869, using a boat to reach Wizard Island and publishing an article about their experience in the Jacksonville newspaper. Sutton suggested the new name of "Crater Lake".

Mount Mazama received its English name in 1896 from William G. Steel, the founder of the climbing club The Mazamas, which formed at Mount Hood in 1894. The word comes from a Native American word meaning "mountain goat", derived from an Aztec term to refer to "small deer". Steel gave United States Geological Survey geologist Joseph S. Diller the idea for Mazama's name to help promote national park status for the vicinity by using his organization as the inspiration for the mountain's name. Crater Lake is called Giiwas in the Klamath language. Steel had helped map Crater Lake in 1886 with Clarence Dutton of the United States Geological Survey. The conservation movement in the United States was gaining traction, so Steel's efforts to preserve the Mazama area were achieved on two scales, first with the creation of the local Cascade Range Forest Reserve in 1893, and then on May 22, 1902 with the recognition of Crater Lake National Park.

A few decades after its discovery, Mazama began attracting geological interest. After conducting research at Mazama during the 1880s, in 1902, Joseph S. Diller published a major report with the United States Geological Survey concerning Crater Lake National Park. In the study, he and co-author Horace B. Patton made the claim that Mazama had collapsed instead of being blown apart, the first American geologists to do so. Their work was followed by research led by Howel Williams of the University of California, Berkeley, which was published in 1942. In the paper, Williams mapped the volcano's dacite and andesite lava flow deposits. During the 1980s, Charles Bacon and other United States Geological Survey geologists expanded on Williams's work, determining more specific details about its caldera formation.

Recreation 

Crater Lake and the remnants of Mount Mazama can be seen from Rim Drive, a  road that surrounds the caldera, which is the only part within the Crater Lake National Park where vehicles are permitted. The Cleetwood trail leads for  down the northern flank of the caldera rim, eventually reaching Cleetwood Cove where boat trips run from late June or early July throughout the summer season to Wizard Island. Wizard Island can be climbed, offering views of Crater Lake.

Because Mount Mazama lies within a national park area, collecting rocks within the vicinity is prohibited unless a permit is obtained. The park's facilities lie at Rim Village, at the southern edge of the caldera. Lodging and camping facilities open during the summer season between May and October. No lodges, gas stations, or camping areas remain open from October through late May. Popular activities within Crater Lake National Park include biking, fishing, cross-country skiing, and snowshoeing.

See also 
 Volcanic Legacy Scenic Byway

Notes

References

Citations

Sources 

 
 
 
 
 
 
 
 
 
 
 
 
 
 
 
 
 
 
 
 
 
 
 
 
 

Cascade Range
Cascade Volcanoes
Mountains of Oregon
Stratovolcanoes of the United States
Subduction volcanoes
Calderas of Oregon
Volcanoes of Oregon
VEI-7 volcanoes
Supervolcanoes
Crater Lake National Park
Mountains of Klamath County, Oregon
6th millennium BC
Mountains of Douglas County, Oregon
Volcanoes of Klamath County, Oregon
Holocene calderas